Saint Albert the Great Science Academy is a private Catholic pre-school, primary and secondary school, located in San Carlos City, Pangasinan, in the Philippines. The school as founded in 2004, under the patronage of St. Albert the Great and inspiration of Our Blessed Mother Mary.

Patron saint 

Albertus Magnus, O.P. (before 1200 – November 15, 1280), also known as Albert the Great and Albert of Cologne, is a Catholic saint. He was a German Dominican friar and a Catholic bishop. He was known during his lifetime as doctor universalis and doctor expertus and, late in his life, the term magnus was appended to his name. Scholars such as James A. Weisheipl and Joachim R. Söder referred to him as the greatest German philosopher and theologian of the Middle Ages. The Catholic Church honored him as a Doctor of the Church, one of only 36 so honored.

History 

The academy was established in 2004 through the efforts of the academy board under the leadership of the founding head. The feasibility and sustainability of a private school outside the city was uncertain but with the concerted efforts of the school staff a steady growth of students was seen from 2005 to 2010. The school served students from various family backgrounds and socioeconomic status from children of OFWs (Overseas contract workers) to sons and daughters of farmers and small scale traders. Over the years, the role and contribution of the school has been significant in the community by providing affordable and comprehensive education. The academy has been identified as an institution that gives opportunities to students in achieving their dreams.

In 2009, the elementary department transferred to the newly constructed Liem Dela Paz Hall while the High school department was officially opened and housed at the three-storey St. Thomas More Hall. Currently, the school offers a complete K-12 program and is in constant consultation with stakeholders in order to improve instructions and learning environment. During the 10th Commencement exercises of the academy Prof. Augusto Antonio Aguila, Ph.D. Executive Secretary  of the Office of the Rector of the Pontifical and Royal University of Santo Tomas mentioned that the greater goal and achievement of an institution is measured by how much it contributes in uplifting and determining the degree social and economic status of students.

Education philosophy 

All faculty and staff are teachers, from the President to the Janitor, regardless of their particular duties, and must be willing to work in close contact and cooperate with the parents to protect the rights of both parent and student. The faculty and staff, because of their commitment as Catholic lay  apostles, will be leading the students in all areas of education, not solely in their own expertise St. Bonaventure once said, "A real teacher is he who knows how  to enrich the mind with thoughts, to illumine it, and instill virtues in the disciple’s heart." At all times, the school fosters a genuine sense of wonder and love of learning in the souls of your students. If the children feel that their lessons are mere occupation or busywork, they will be disheartened and our purpose of making them lifelong learners will be in vain. If however their lessons emphasize the beauty and mystery of the world around them, they will become enthusiastic just like St. Albert. The school encourages interest in the world as an understanding of the grand scheme of God’s love. This means that we ask ourselves, "Why is this lesson worth learning?" and try to find an answer. The school tries to question what is known and to reach a better understanding.

See also 

 Education in the Philippines

References

Catholic elementary schools in the Philippines
Catholic secondary schools in the Philippines
Educational institutions established in 2004
2004 establishments in the Philippines
Schools in Pangasinan